The history of Toyota started in 1933 with the company being a division of Toyoda Automatic Loom Works devoted to the production of cars under the direction of the founder's son, Kiichiro Toyoda. Kiichiro Toyoda had traveled to Europe and the United States in 1929 to investigate automobile production and had begun researching gasoline-powered engines in 1930. Toyoda Automatic Loom Works was encouraged to develop automobile production by the Japanese government, which needed domestic vehicle production, due to the war with China.  Kiichiro Toyoda seized this opportunity to establish the Automotive Production Division on September 1, 1933, and began preparing to build prototype vehicles. In 1934, the division produced its first Type A Engine, which was used in the first Model A1 passenger car in May 1935 and the G1 truck in August 1935.  Production of the Model AA passenger car started in 1936.  Early vehicles bear a striking resemblance to the Dodge Power Wagon and 1930's Chevrolet, with some parts actually interchanging with their American originals.

Although the Toyota Group is best known today for its cars, it is still in the textile business and still makes automatic looms, which are now computerized, and electric sewing machines which are available, worldwide.

Beginning

Toyota Motor Co. was established as an independent and separate company in 1937. Although the founding family's name was written in the Kanji "豊田" (rendered as "Toyoda"), the company name was changed to a similar word in katakana - トヨタ (rendered as "Toyota") because the latter has 8 strokes which is regarded as a lucky number in East Asian culture. Since Kanji are essentially Chinese characters, in Chinese speaking markets, the company and its vehicles are still referred to by the original Kanji name, but with Chinese pronunciation.

With the Japanese economy modernizing and expanding during the 1930s, both Ford and GM had built factories in Japan where vehicles were imported from America in knock down kits and assembled locally. The Ford Yokohama facility started in March 1925 and GM built a factory at Osaka starting in April 1927. By 1929, both Ford and GM controlled most of the Japanese automobile market, producing 28,000 vehicles in 1929. During development of the company's first car, the Toyota AA, the company purchased locally manufactured GM and Ford products, reverse engineered them, and hired engineers who had previously worked at the Japanese Ford and GM factories in developing Toyota products.

During the Pacific War (World War II) the company was dedicated to truck production for the Imperial Japanese Army. Because of severe shortages in Japan, military trucks were kept as simple as possible. For example, the trucks had only one headlight in the center of the hood. The war ended shortly before a scheduled Allied bombing run on the Toyota factories in Aichi.

Postwar growth

After World War II, Japan experienced extreme economic difficulty. Commercial passenger car production started in 1947 with the model SA. The company was on the brink of bankruptcy by the end of 1949, but the company eventually obtained a loan from a consortium of banks which stipulated an independent sales operation and elimination of "excess manpower".

In June 1950, the company produced only 300 trucks and was on the verge of going out of business. The management announced layoffs and wage reductions, and in response the union went on a strike that lasted two months. The strike was resolved by an agreement that included layoffs and pay reductions but also the resignation of the president at the time, Kiichiro Toyoda. Toyoda was succeeded by Taizo Ishida, who was the chief executive of the Toyoda Automatic Loom company. The first few months of the Korean War resulted in an order of over 5,000 vehicles from the US military, and the company was revived. Ishida was credited for his focus on investment in equipment. One example was the construction of the Motomachi Plant in 1959, which gave Toyota a decisive lead over Nissan during the 1960s.

In 1950, a separate sales company, Toyota Motor Sales Co., was established (which lasted until July 1982). In April 1956, the Toyopet dealer chain was established. In 1957, the Crown became the first Japanese car to be exported to the United States and Toyota's American and Brazilian divisions, Toyota Motor Sales Inc. and Toyota do Brasil S.A., were also established.

Global presence
Toyota began to expand in the 1960s with a new research and development facility, a presence in Thailand was established, the 10 millionth model was produced, a Deming Prize, and partnerships with Hino Motors and Daihatsu were also established. The first Toyota built outside Japan was in November 12, 1962, in São Bernardo do Campo, Brazil. By the end of the decade, Toyota had established a worldwide presence, as the company had exported its one-millionth unit.

The first Japanese vehicles to arrive in the American continents were five Land Cruisers in El Salvador in May 1953. The first Toyotas sent to Canada were a shipment of 115 Crowns sent in February 1965.

The first Toyotas sent to Europe were two Toyopet Tiaras sent to Finland for evaluation in June 1962, but no sales followed, although the importer introduced the cars to the press in October the same year. The first European importer was Erla Auto Import A/S of Denmark, who brought in 400 Crowns following a May 1963 agreement to become the distributor for Denmark, Norway, and Sweden. The Netherlands followed in May 1964, and after having established toeholds in countries with little or no indigenous automobile production other markets followed in 1966. In 1968 Toyota established its first European CKD assembler, Salvador Caetano I.M.V.T. of Portugal.

2008–2012
With high fuel prices and a weak US economy in mid-2008, Toyota reported a double-digit decline in sales for the month of June, similar to figures reported by the Detroit Big Three. For Toyota, these were attributed mainly to slow sales of its Tundra pickup, as well as shortages of its fuel-efficient vehicles such as the Prius, Corolla and Yaris. In response, the company announced plans to idle its truck plants, while shifting production at other facilities to manufacture in-demand vehicles.

In January 2010, Toyota suspended sales of eight recalled vehicle models to fix accelerator pedals with mechanical problems that could cause them to become stuck.

References

External links 
 Official History of Toyota

Toyota
Toyota
Toyota